Yitzchak Lowy (1887–1942), also known as Yitskhok Levi, Jizchak Löwy, Jacques Levy, Djak Levi, was a Polish Yiddish theater actor. 

Lowy was born in Warsaw, Poland. In 1907, he joined a Yiddish theater troupe and toured Eastern and Western Europe. From October 1911 through 1912 the troupe stated in Prague, where Lowy became good friends with Franz Kafka. He was murdered in the Treblinka extermination camp.

References

1887 births
1942 deaths
Polish Jews who died in the Holocaust
Polish people who died in Treblinka extermination camp
Male actors from Warsaw
Yiddish theatre performers